Aisin Gioro Mianmin (6 March 1797 – 11 November 1836) was a Qing dynasty imperial prince as the third son of Yonglin and Qianlong Emperor.

Life 
Mianmin was born on 6 March 1797 to Yonglin's second primary consort, lady Wugiya.  In 1802, Mianmin was awarded a title of the grace bulwark duke. In February 1816, he arrived late for the banquet at the Palace of Heavenly Purity in the Forbidden City. Prince of the Fourth Rank, Yishao cast his bowl upon the ground and ordered him to take a place. Yonglin's attempt to report the matter via his eunuch was persecuted.  In 1819, he was promoted to the prince of the fourth rank. In 1820, Mianmin inherited the Prince Qing peerage as the prince of the second rank because the peerage has not been awarded iron-cap status.  In February 1823, he was exempt from overseeing music department of the Yonghe Temple, thus entrusting the internal affairs to Yishao. Mianmin died on 11 November 1836 and was posthumously honoured as "Prince Qingliang of the Second Rank" (庆良郡王, "qingliang" meaning "content and gentle"). 

As Mianmin's children died prematurely, he adopted Mianzhi's son Yicai as a successor.

Tomb 

Mianmin's tomb is located near the family mausoleum of the Prince Qing (Tomb of the White Sheep) in Changping village, where his father was buried. Unlike the Tomb of the White Sheep, the mausoleum is endangered by destruction. The only remaining building is central gate. The stone kurhan on the tomb was razed to the fundament.

Family 
Consorts and issue:

 Primary consort, of the Ezha clan (嫡福晋 额扎氏)
 Second primary consort, of the Fuca clan (继福晋 富察氏)
 Yiyuan (1817-1818), first son
 Yibin (1827-1833), second son
 Unknown
 Eldest daughter
 Married first class taiji Ayuxi (阿玉喜) of Khorchin Borjigit clan

Adopted son: Yicai (1820-1866), held a title of Prince Qing of the Second Rank in 1839-1842

References 

Qing dynasty imperial princes
Prince Qing
1797 births
1836 deaths